Grosbeak  is a form taxon containing various species of seed-eating passerine birds with large beaks. Although they all belong to the superfamily Passeroidea, these birds are not part of a natural group but rather a polyphyletic assemblage of distantly related songbirds. Some are cardueline finches in the family Fringillidae, while others are cardinals in the family Cardinalidae; one is a member of the weaver family Ploceidae. The word "grosbeak", first applied in the late 1670s, is a partial translation of the French grosbec, where gros means "large" and bec means "beak".

The following is a list of grosbeak species, arranged in groups of closely related genera. These genera are more closely related to smaller-billed birds than to other grosbeaks. Exceptions are the three genera of "typical grosbeak finches", which form a group of closest living relatives and might thus be considered the "true" grosbeaks.

Grosbeak finches
 
The finch family (Fringillidae) contains 13 living species named "grosbeak", which are all part of the large subfamily Carduelinae:

Typical grosbeak finches
 The two Nearctic species in the genus Hesperiphona (formerly in Coccothraustes):
 Evening grosbeak, H. vespertina
 Hooded grosbeak, H. abeillei
 The two species in the East Asian genus Eophona: 
 Japanese grosbeak, E. personata
 Chinese grosbeak or yellow-billed grosbeak, E. migratoria
 The four species in the South Asian genus Mycerobas: 
 Black-and-yellow grosbeak, M. icterioides
 Collared grosbeak, M. affinis
 Spot-winged grosbeak, M. melanozanthos
 White-winged grosbeak, M. carnipes
grosbeak bullfinch
 The pine grosbeak, Pinicola enucleator, a Holarctic pine forest species
grosbeak goldfinches
 The three golden-winged grosbeaks in the genus Rhynchostruthus, found in Somaliland, mountains of south-west Arabia and on the island of Socotra and often considered a single species:
 Somali golden-winged grosbeak, R. louisae
 Arabian golden-winged grosbeak, R. percivali
 Socotra golden-winged grosbeak, R. socotranus
Genus Crithagra
Two species in the genus Crithagra are named "grosbeak-canaries" and one is called a grosbeak:
 The São Tomé grosbeak, Crithagra concolor (formerly Neospiza concolor), a critically endangered restricted-range endemic found only in forests on the island of São Tomé off the West African coast, believed extinct until rediscovered in 1991
 The Northern grosbeak-canary or Abyssinian grosbeak-canary, Crithagra donaldsoni
 The Southern grosbeak-canary or Kenya grosbeak-canary, Crithagra buchanani

In addition, there are two extinct Fringillidae "grosbeaks": 
 The Bonin grosbeak (Chaunoproctus ferreorostris), found only on the Ogasawara Islands, which was last recorded in 1832. Its relationships are obscure, but it was probably another member of the cardueline finches.
 The Kona grosbeak or grosbeak finch (Chloridops kona), last recorded in 1896. It was a Hawaiian honeycreeper, subfamily Drepanidinae.

Cardinal-grosbeaks
The cardinal family (Cardinalidae) of the Americas contains the following 17 "grosbeaks":

Typical cardinal-grosbeaks
 The six species in the genus Pheucticus
 Mexican yellow grosbeak, P. chrysopeplus
 Southern yellow grosbeak, P. chrysogaster
 Black-thighed grosbeak, P. tibialis, a restricted-range endemic found only in the highlands of Costa Rica and Panama
 Black-backed grosbeak, P. aureoventris
 Rose-breasted grosbeak, P. ludovicianus
 Black-headed grosbeak, P. melanocephalus

Masked cardinal-grosbeaks
 The red-and-black grosbeak, Periporphyrus erythromelas of northern South America
 The two species in the Neotropical genus Caryothraustes:
 Black-faced grosbeak, C. poliogaster
 Yellow-green grosbeak, C. canadensis
 The crimson-collared grosbeak, Rhodothraupis celaeno, a restricted-range endemic found only in eastern Mexico
 

Blue cardinal-grosbeaks
 Two species in the Neotropical genus Cyanocompsa which also contains the blue bunting (C. parellina):
 Ultramarine grosbeak, C. brissonii
 Blue-black grosbeak, C. cyanoides
 The glaucous-blue grosbeak (Cyanoloxia glaucocaerulea) of eastern South America
 One species (sometimes separated in Guiraca) in the genus Passerina, which also contains the North American buntings:
 Blue grosbeak, Passerina caerulea

Grosbeak tanagers
 
Three additional species of "grosbeaks" have long been placed in the Cardinalidae, but actually seem to be closer to the tanager family (Thraupidae):
 Two species in the Neotropical genus Saltator, which also contains the saltators:
 Slate-coloured grosbeak, S. grossus
 Black-throated grosbeak, S. fuliginosus
 The yellow-shouldered grosbeak, Parkerthraustes humeralis of South America

Thick-billed weaver
Finally, the weaver family (Ploceidae) contains a species called the thick-billed weaver (Amblyospiza albifrons).

References

Cited texts
 

Bird common names